Kranji is a suburb in northwestern Singapore, bounded by Sungei Kadut to the north, Turf Club to the east, as well as Lim Chu Kang and the Western Water Catchment to the west.

Etymology
Kranji is named after a local tree, pokok kranji or keranji (Malay for Dialium indum, velvet tamarind tree).

History

Kranji served as a military camp before the Japanese invasion of Singapore in 1942, and is now the home of the Kranji War Cemetery and Kranji War Memorial, commemorating the 30,000 Commonwealth personnel who died in Singapore, Malaya, Java and Sumatra during World War II.

In addition, it is now a prime residential area comprising mostly stand-alone properties. There are no towering apartment blocks, unlike most suburbs of Singapore. It is also an industrial area.

Highlights
The Singapore Turf Club operates Kranji Racecourse, the only horse racing race course in Singapore. It is located next to the Kranji MRT station.

There is also a reservoir known as Kranji Reservoir, which was formed by the damming of the Kranji River.

Bollywood Veggies is an organic farming collective and information centre open Wednesdays - Sundays.

Transportation
In 1903, the Singapore-Kranji Railway was launched with four stations, running from Tank Road to Kranji.

It is connected to Kranji MRT station and is one of the main boarding and alighting stops to and from Johor Bahru for Bus Service 160 and 170/X.

References

Romen Bose (2006), "Kranji - The Commonwealth War Cemetery and the Politics of the Dead", Marshall Cavendish Editions,

External links
Kranji War Cemetery and Singapore Memorial
Singapore Turf Club

 
Places in Singapore